"Radio" is a song by Norwegian hip-hop/rap duo Cir.Cuz from their debut studio album Alt I Sin Tid. It was released on 28 February 2011 as a digital download in Norway. The song has peaked to number 2 on the Norwegian Singles Chart.

Track listing

Chart performance

Release history

See also
 "Diva"

References

External links
Official website
Cir.Cuz on Facebook

2011 singles
Cir.Cuz songs
2011 songs